The Museo Alameda was the largest Latino museum in the USA and the first formal Smithsonian affiliate outside of Washington D.C., located in the historic Market Square in Downtown San Antonio, Texas. In 1996, Secretary I. Michael Heyman of the Smithsonian Institution announced a physical presence of the Smithsonian in San Antonio and gave birth to the Smithsonian's affiliations program. In May of the same year, Governor George W. Bush signed a joint resolution of the Texas legislature establishing the Museo Alameda as the official State Latino Museum.

The Museo Alameda opened to the public in April 2007, and has since showcased work from throughout the United States and all of Latin America. Past Exhibitions include: Phantom Sightings: Art After the Chicano Movement (March 2009), American Sabor: Latinos in U.S. Popular Music (June 2009), Escultura Social: A New Generation of Art from Mexico City (July 2008), Myth, Mortals, and Immortality: Works from Museo Soumaya de México (June 2008) and Azucar! The Life and Music of Celia Cruz (September 2007). The Museo has also displayed the work of several local San Antonio artists including Alex Rubio and Vincent Valdez in their 2007 exhibition San Anto: Pride of the Southside/En El Mero Hueso (December 2007) and Jesse Treviño in his 2009 exhibition Jesse Treviño: Mi Vida (October 2009). In 2011 Manuel Castillo: The Painting of a Community was an exhibit that honored the late  Executive Director of San Anto Cultural Arts Manny Castillio and his contributions to San Antoino's Westside Murals among the artist who participated were local artists who painted murals for the San Anto Cultural Arts Mural Program. Castiilo died in January 2009. The show featured works by Castillo and 16 past and present San Anto muralists who had brightened San Antonio's Westside with their work since 1996. The roster included: Valerie Aranda, David Blancas, Ruth Buentello, Jose Cosme, Adriana Garcia, Gerry and Cardee Garcia, Jane Madrigal, Cruz Ortiz, Juan Ramos, Israel Rico, Christian Rodriguez, Mike Roman, Alex Rubio, and Enrico Salinas

In August 2012, the Museo Alameda announced its impending closure on September 30, 2012, with A&M-San Antonio taking on a new five-year lease; Univision station KWEX-DT also uses the space under a sub-lease as a secondary downtown studio.

Exhibitions
2012
 Prehispanic Art in West Mexico
 Guanajuato through Reséndiz' Art

2011
 Día de los Muertos: A Mexican Tradition
 Manuel Castillo: The Painting of a Community

2010
 Revolution & Renaissance: Mexico & San Antonio 1910 - 2010
 Bittersweet Harvest: The Bracero Program 1942 - 1964
 Arte en la Charrería: The Artisanship of Mexican Equestrian Culture
 
2009
 Jesse Treviño: Mi Vida
 Frida Kahlo: Through the Lens of Nickolas Murray
 American Sabor: Latinos in U.S. Popular Music
 Becoming American: Teenagers and Immigration, Photographs by Barbara Beirne
 Phantom Sightings: Art After the Chicano Movement
 Caras Vemos, Corazones No Sabemos: The Human Landscape of Mexican Migration

2008
 The African Presence in Mexico: From Yanga to the Present
 Dichos: Words to Live, Love and Laugh by in Latin America
 Myth, Mortals, and Immortality: Works from Museo Soumaya de México
 Escultura Social: A New Generation of Art from Mexico City
 Laura Aguilar: Life, the Body, Her Perspective
 Of Rage and Redemption: The Art of Guayasamín
 Latin American Posters: Public Aesthetics and Mass Politics
 Nosotras: Portraits of Latinas

2007
 San Anto: Pride of the Southside/En El Mero Hueso
 Azucar! The Life and Music of Celia Cruz
 Hupilies: A Celebration
 Cape
 Cantos del Pueblo: Tejano Musical Landscape
 Conjunto
 Tremendo Manicure
 Palace of Dreams: The Golden Age of the Alameda Theater

Board of directors
 Rolando B. Pablos - Chairman of the Board
 Ernest Bromley
 Jorge Canavati
 Dr. Hugo Castañeda
 Helen Z. Coronado
 Pete Cortez
 Ricardo Danel
 Norma De Leon
 Dolores Ealy
 Dr. Ma. Antonieta Gonzalez
 Guillermo Hoyos
 Cosme Huerta
 Rosemary Kowalski
 Ricardo Martinez
 Alberto Milmo
 Marcelo Sanchez
 Pablo Uribe

References

External links 

Museums in San Antonio
Art museums and galleries in Texas
Art museums established in 2007
Museo Alameda
Latino museums in the United States
Museo Alameda
Defunct museums in Texas
Art museums disestablished in 2012
2012 disestablishments in Texas